Bhinyad is a village located 82  km north of Barmer, Rajasthan, India, on the Ramdevara road. It has ten wards and boasts a population of about 10,000 in 10 km2.

Villages in Barmer district